John Martin Vorys (June 16, 1896 – August 25, 1968) was a U.S. Representative from Ohio.

Early life
Born in Lancaster, Ohio, Vorys attended the public schools in Lancaster and Columbus, Ohio. During the First World War served overseas as a pilot in the famous "Yale Unit" of the United States Naval Air Service, retiring to inactive service in 1919 with rank of lieutenant. He graduated from Yale University in 1918, where he was a member of Skull and Bones, and from Ohio State University Law School at Columbus in 1923. He was a teacher in the College of Yale, Changsha, China, in 1919 and 1920. He served as assistant secretary, American delegation, Conference on Limitation of Armaments, Washington, D.C., in 1921 and 1922. He was admitted to the bar in 1923 and commenced practice in Columbus, Ohio, at the firm founded by his grandfather, Vorys, Sater, Seymour and Pease.

Political career
He served as member of the Ohio House of Representatives in 1923 and 1924, and in the Ohio Senate in 1925 and 1926. He served as director of aeronautics of Ohio in 1929 and 1930.

Vorys was elected as a Republican to the Seventy-sixth and to the nine succeeding Congresses (January 3, 1939 – January 3, 1959). He did not seek reelection in 1958. Vorys voted in favor of the Civil Rights Act of 1957.

A confidential 1943 analysis of the House Foreign Affairs Committee by Isaiah Berlin for the British Foreign Office described Vorys as

In 1947–8, he served on the Herter Committee.

Vorys served as delegate to the United Nations General Assembly in 1951, and as Regent of the Smithsonian Institution 1949–1959, before resuming the practice of law.

He died in Columbus, Ohio, August 25, 1968, and was interred in Green Lawn Cemetery.

Buchenwald Concentration Camp 
On 11 April 1945, US forces liberated the Buchenwald Concentration Camp which was established in 1937 and caused the death of a least 56,545 people. General Eisenhower left rotting corpses unburied so a visiting group of US legislators could truly understand the horror of the atrocities. This group was visiting Buchenwald to inspect the camp and learn firsthand about the enormity of the Nazi Final Solution and treatment of other prisoners.

The legislators who visited included Alben W. Barkley, Ed Izac, John M. Vorys, Dewey Short, C. Wayland Brooks, and Kenneth S. Wherry along with General Omar N. Bradley and journalists Joseph Pulitzer, Norman Chandler, William I. Nichols and Julius Ochs Adler.

References

 Retrieved on 2009-02-22

1896 births
1968 deaths
Republican Party members of the United States House of Representatives from Ohio
People from Lancaster, Ohio
Politicians from Columbus, Ohio
Ohio lawyers
Burials at Green Lawn Cemetery (Columbus, Ohio)
Yale University alumni
American military personnel of World War I
Republican Party members of the Ohio House of Representatives
Ohio State University Moritz College of Law alumni
Republican Party Ohio state senators
20th-century American politicians
Lawyers from Columbus, Ohio
20th-century American lawyers